St. Vincent Archabbey Gristmill, also known as The Gristmill, is a historic grist mill located in Unity Township, Westmoreland County, Pennsylvania. A  addition was built in 1883. The mill operated by steam and remains in use. It was built as part of Saint Vincent Archabbey, the first Benedictine Monastery in the United States, which opened in 1846.

It was added to the National Register of Historic Places in 1978.

References

External links
Saint Vincent Archabbey Gristmill website

Grinding mills on the National Register of Historic Places in Pennsylvania
Industrial buildings completed in 1854
Industrial buildings completed in 1883
Buildings and structures in Westmoreland County, Pennsylvania
Grinding mills in Pennsylvania
Tourist attractions in Westmoreland County, Pennsylvania
National Register of Historic Places in Westmoreland County, Pennsylvania
1854 establishments in Pennsylvania